Habibah bint Ubayd Allah is the daughter of Ubayd Allah ibn Jahsh and Ramla bint Abi Sufyan.

Family background 
Habibah's father was the brother of Zaynab bint Jahsh, whom Muhammad married at some point, thus is Muhammad Habibah's aunt's husband. 

After her parents got divorced, due to her father abandoning Islam for Christianity, her mother married Muhammad. Thus, Muhammad became her step-father as well. She married Dawud ibn Urwah ibn Mas'ud al-Thaqifi.

She has been recorded with the odd name "Habibah bint Umm Habibah bint Abu Sufyan" in some Islamic biography books. This could be due to her father leaving Islam.

Notes 

Women companions of the Prophet
7th-century Arabs